This is a list of the world's countries and their dependencies by land, water, and total area, ranked by total area.

Entries in this list include, but are not limited to, those in the ISO 3166-1 standard, which includes sovereign states and dependent territories. All 193 member states of the United Nations plus the two observer states are given a rank number. Largely unrecognised states not in ISO 3166-1 are included in the list in ranked order. The areas of such largely unrecognised states are in most cases also included in the areas of the more widely recognised states that claim the same territory; see the notes in the "notes" column for each country for clarification.

Not included in the list are individual country claims to parts of the continent of Antarctica or entities such as the European Union that have some degree of sovereignty but do not consider themselves to be sovereign countries or dependent territories.

This list includes three measurements of area:

Total area: the sum of land and water areas within international boundaries and coastlines.
Land area: the aggregate of all land within international boundaries and coastlines, excluding water area.
 Water area: the sum of the surface areas of all inland water bodies (lakes, reservoirs, and rivers) within international boundaries and coastlines. Coastal internal waters may be included. Territorial seas are not included unless otherwise noted. Contiguous zones and exclusive economic zones are not included.

Data is taken from the United Nations Statistics Division unless otherwise noted.

Map

Countries and dependencies by area

Charts 
The charts below are based on the CIA World Factbook as of 15 February 2005.

Sovereign states with areas greater than 100,000 km2 are shown in green. In addition, non-sovereign territories are included for purposes of comparison, and are shown in gray. Areas include inland water bodies (lakes, reservoirs, rivers). Claims to parts of Antarctica by various countries are not included.

Countries larger than 1.5 million km2

Countries between 100,000 km2 and 1.5 million km2

See also 

 List of countries and dependencies by population density
 List of countries and dependencies by population
 List of European countries by area
 List of largest empires
 List of political and geographic subdivisions by total area
 List of sovereign states
 Orders of magnitude (area)

Explanatory notes

References

External links 
Countries of the world ordered by land area

 
Geography-related lists
Area
Lists by area
Area